Mersin İdmanyurdu (also Mersin İdman Yurdu, Mersin İY, or MİY) Sports Club; located in Mersin, east Mediterranean coast of Turkey in 1976–77. Mersin İdmanyurdu has promoted from Second League 1975–76, after two season break to first division. It was the second time the team promoted to first division. In the first time, they have remained at the league for seven season. This second promotion had let the team to stay two more seasons. The 1976–77 season was the eighth season of Mersin İdmanyurdu (MİY) football team in Turkish First Football League in total. They finished seventh in the league.

General captain was Mustafa Oğultürk (11.10.1976).

Pre-season
Before the start of the league, MİY played eight preparation matches. Two matches were played with İskenderunspor in Mersin on 14 and 15 August. Then the team moved to Adana to play "Çukurova Football Tournament".
 29.08.1976 - MİY-Adana Demirspor: 2-0.

1976–77 First League participation
First League was played with 16 teams in its 20th season, 1976–77. Winner became eligible for European Champion Clubs Cup, runner-up and third teams became eligible for UEFA Cup next season. Trabzonspor also won the Turkish Cup. Beşiktaş was the cup finalist and became eligible for European Cup Winners Cup next year. Last two teams relegated to Second League 1977-78. Mersin İY became 7th with 9 wins and 25 goals.

Results summary
Mersin İdmanyurdu (MİY) 1976–77 First League summary:

Sources: 1976–77 Turkish First Football League pages.

League table
Mersin İY's league performance in First League in 1976–77 season is shown in the following table.

Won, drawn and lost points are 2, 1 and 0. F belongs to MİY and A belongs to corresponding team for both home and away matches. Champions went to ECC 1977–78, and runners-up and second runners-up became eligible for EUC 1977–78.

Results by round
Results of games MİY played in 1976–77 First League by rounds:

First half

Second half

1976–77 Turkish Cup participation
1976–77  Turkish Cup was played for the 15th season as Türkiye Kupası by 96 teams. First and second elimination rounds were played in one-leg elimination system. Third and fourth elimination rounds and finals were played in two-legs elimination system. Mersin İdmanyurdu participated in 1976–77  Turkish Cup from round 3 and eliminated at round 4 by Göztepe. Göztepe was eliminated by Beşiktaş at quarterfinals. Trabzonspor won the Cup for the first time. Cup finalist Beşiktaş became eligible for playing 1977–78 ECW Cup, because Trabzonspor also won the league title.

Cup track
The drawings and results Mersin İdmanyurdu (MİY) followed in 1976–77 Turkish Cup are shown in the following table.

Note: In the above table 'Score' shows For and Against goals whether the match played at home or not.

Game details
Mersin İdmanyurdu (MİY) 1976–77 Turkish Cup game reports is shown in the following table.
Kick off times are in EET and EEST.

Source: 1976–77 Turkish Cup pages.

Management

Club management
Burhan Kanun was club president.

Coaching team

1976–77 Mersin İdmanyurdu head coaches:

Note: Only official games were included.

1976–77 squad
Stats are counted for 1976–77 First League matches and 1976–77 Turkish Cup (Türkiye Kupası) matches. In the team rosters five substitutes were allowed to appear, two of whom were substitutable. Only the players who appeared in game rosters were included and listed in the order of appearance.

Sources: 1976–77 season squad data from maçkolik com, Milliyet, and Cem Pekin Archives.

 Transfers in (Summer 1976): Tuğrul (Beşiktaş), Müjdat (İstanbulspor), Enver (Balıkesirspor). After lose against Adana Demirspor, Lütfü from Beşiktaş, Serdar from Galatasaray and Erdoğan from Fenerbahçe have signed.
 Transfers out: Burhan (Düzcespor); Doğan (Göztepe); Ramazan (İskenderunspor).

See also
 Football in Turkey
 1976–77 Turkish First Football League
 1976–77 Turkish Cup

Notes and references

Mersin İdman Yurdu seasons
Turkish football clubs 1976–77 season